Saxo  may refer to:

 Citroën Saxo, automobile model
 Annalista Saxo, anonymous author of an imperial chronicle
 Poeta Saxo, anonymous Saxon poet
 Saxo Grammaticus (c. 1150–1220), Danish historian
 Saxo Bank, a Danish investment bank
 Team Saxo Bank, a cycling team sponsored by Saxo Bank

See also
 Conrad of Saxony, also called Conradus Saxo